The 404 is a colloquial reference to Ontario Highway 404.

The 404 may also refer to:

 HTTP 404
 Area code 404, in Atlanta
 The 404 Show, an audio and video podcast on CNET Video

See also
 404 (disambiguation)